Busan–Gimhae Light Rail Transit Operation Corporation, also known as B&G Metro is a private corporation which was established in 2003 to operate the Busan–Gimhae Light Rail Transit in Gimhae, South Gyeongsang, South Korea.

See also 
 Busan–Gimhae Light Rail Transit

References

External links 
 BGLRT Operation Co., Ltd. website

Busan Metro
Railway companies of South Korea
Transport operators of South Korea
Companies based in Gimhae
Railway companies established in 2003
South Korean companies established in 2003